Alpinia acuminata is a monocotyledonous plant species described by Rosemary Margaret Smith. Alpinia acuminata is part of the genus Alpinia and the family Zingiberaceae.

The species' range is Papua New Guinea. No subspecies are listed in the Catalog of Life.

References 

acuminata
Taxa named by Rosemary Margaret Smith